Ulf Fase (died 1247) was the jarl of Sweden (c. 1221-47) .

Biography
Ulf Fase was probably the son of jarl Charles the Deaf (Karl Döve)  and member the house of   Folkung (Folkungaätten).
After jarl Charles  had been killed during the Swedish attack against Estonians at the  Battle of Lihula in 1220, Ulf as his closest relative was soon selected as the new jarl. An ephemeral jarl may have served briefly before Ulf's appointment. Before the death of King John I of Sweden in 1222, Ulf certainly held the office. 

In 1222, the rival dynasty's young heir, King Eric XI  (Erik Eriksson) ascended the throne at the age of 6. His minority meant that jarl Ulf gained more importance along with Canute II of Sweden (Knut långe).  The nominal regent was Ulf's cousin Bengt Birgersson.
In 1229, King Canute II  usurped the throne and exiled the young Eric. Ulf continued to hold the position of jarl. Upon Canute's death in 1234, King Eric, now 18, was restored to the throne. His supporters did not appreciate Ulf's "treachery" in accepting an usurper over Eric five years earlier. Ulf however was too powerful to be deposed from his office. There are clear records to show that Ulf Fase had the right to mint money, an otherwise exclusively royal prerogative. Several pieces of such coins, bearing his signs, are preserved.

In 1247, there was an attempted coup against King Eric. The rebels were crushed at the Battle of Sparrsätra. Sources do not reveal whether Ulf was already dead at that time, or if alive, what was his role in the revolt. It has been speculated that he participated in the revolt and was therefore executed. Several rebel leaders were beheaded in 1247-48, including Canute's son Holmger Knutsson (1210s – 1248). After Ulf's death, the office of jarl was held by his relative Birger Magnusson (Birger jarl).

Ulf Fase left one well-attested son, Karl Ulfsson  who had bad relations with  Birger jarl. He later left into voluntary exile by joining the Teutonic Knights in Livonia. Karl was killed in 1260 at the Battle of Durbe near Riga in Courland.

References

Swedish nobility
1247 deaths
13th-century Swedish people
Year of birth unknown
Swedish jarls
House of Bjelbo